Aleksei Alekseyevich Musatov (born 17 October 1980; died 13 July 2005 in Bryansk Oblast) was a Russian football player.

He died together with his teammate Aleksandr Kovalyov in a traffic accident caused by a moose running onto the road.

Honours
Zhenis Astana
Kazakhstan Premier League bronze: 2003

References

1980 births
2005 deaths
Road incident deaths in Russia
Russian footballers
FC Moscow players
Russian Premier League players
Russian expatriate footballers
Expatriate footballers in Kazakhstan
FC Dynamo Bryansk players
FC Zhenis Astana players
Association football defenders
Sportspeople from Bryansk Oblast